Sultan Osman Sultan Ali Koshin, is the current general sultan of the Issa Musse clans. His family were the traditional holders of the Issa Musse Sultanate.

Sources
DUBUR: Shirweynihii Beesha Ciise Muuse oo si habsami ah u socda iyo nuxurka hadalladii goobta ka yidhaahdeen Ergooyinkii ka qayb galay
Suldaanka guud ee Ciise Muuse oo Raalli-gelin ka bixiyey Aflagaaddo ka soo yeedhay Suldaan Beeshiisa ka tirsan
Beesha Reer Cadaawe(Ciise Muuse) Oo Shaaciyey Suldaan Ay Dhawaan Caleemo Saari Doonaan

Year of birth missing (living people)
Living people
Issa Musa